Yelvertoft is a village and civil parish in West Northamptonshire unitary authority in the county of Northamptonshire, England. At the time of the 2001 census, the parish's population was 821 people, reducing to 764 at the 2011 Census, increasing again to 804 at the 2021 census.

Yelvertoft's main thoroughfare, called High Street, is approximately three quarters of a mile long, from the Parish Church of All Saints to the Village Hall. This linear street follows the course of an ancient Portway known as Salters Way.

History
The town was recorded in the Domesday Book in 1086, where a priest was mentioned. 

The village's name means 'curtilage of Geldfrith'. Old English 'cot', 'cotu', 'cottage(s)' may have been the original generic.

Yelvertoft has maintained a more independent, rural character compared to other villages in the region, such as Crick, because no major transport routes pass through it.

Sites of historical interest include a monument built for the 13th century Rector of the All Saints Church, John Drycson, a charity school building constructed in 1792 (the school was established in 1711) which now serves as the Reading Room, and a town pump dating from 1900, which was renovated in 2000.

Demography
According to the figures obtained at the Census 2001 there are 851 people living in the village, in a total of some 356 houses.

Facilities
Yelvertoft has three churches (Anglican, Congregational, Roman Catholic), a primary school, a butcher's shop/delicatessen, a public house, an Equestrian centre and many small businesses.

Recreational facilities are mainly centred around the village hall and comprises a sports field with cricket and football pitches, a pocket park, children's play area, skate park and a basketball court.

Transport links
Yelvertoft has many accessible transport links.

Bus
There are currently no regular bus services to or from Yelvertoft.

Rail
Railway stations in towns near Yelvertoft include Long Buckby, Market Harborough, Rugby and Northampton.

Road
Yelvertoft is linked by road with access to Junction 18 of the M1 motorway within 5 minutes drive from the village.  Following improvements to Catthorpe interchange in 2016/17 it is no longer possible to leave or join either the M1 or M6 from local roads at Junction 19.  Junction 1 of the M6 and J20 of the M1 are both within 15 minutes drive from Yelvertoft.

Canal
The Grand Union Canal passes close to the village.

References

External links
Yelvertoft.org.uk

Villages in Northamptonshire
Civil parishes in Northamptonshire
West Northamptonshire District